Elections were held in the Muskoka District Municipality of Ontario on October 25, 2010 in conjunction with municipal elections across the province.

Muskoka District Council
Consists of a chair plus mayors of the municipalities as well as a number of district councillors.

Bracebridge

Georgian Bay

Gravenhurst

Huntsville

Lake of Bays

Muskoka Lakes

References 

2010 Ontario municipal elections
District Municipality of Muskoka